Automatic is an Australian rock band formed in Geelong in 1993 by Matt Fenton on guitar and vocals, Alex Jarvis on guitar (both ex-Spinouts), Leigh Marlow on drums and Richard Taylor on bass guitar.

Their single, "Sister K" was engineered by Tom Whitten who earned a nomination at the ARIA Music Awards of 1996 for Engineer of the Year for that and two other releases. "Pump it Up" was engineered by Magoo who earned a nomination in 1999 for the same category for that and one other release.

Members

Matt Fenton (guitar, vocals)
Alex Jarvis (guitar)
Richard Taylor (bass)
Leigh Marlow (drums)
Danny Plant (drums)
Stuart McFarlane (drums)

Discography

Albums

Singles

References

Australian rock music groups
Musical groups established in 1993
Musical groups from Geelong